In mathematics, a condensation point p of a subset S of a topological space is any point p such that every neighborhood of p contains uncountably many points of S. Thus "condensation point" is synonymous with "-accumulation point".

Examples
If S = (0,1) is the open unit interval, a subset of the real numbers, then 0 is a condensation point of S.
If S is an uncountable subset of a set X endowed with the indiscrete topology, then any point p of X is a condensation point of X as the only neighborhood of p is X itself.

References

 Walter Rudin, Principles of Mathematical Analysis, 3rd Edition, Chapter 2, exercise 27
 John C. Oxtoby, Measure and Category, 2nd Edition (1980), 
 Lynn Steen and J. Arthur Seebach, Jr., Counterexamples in Topology, 2nd Edition, pg. 4

Mathematical objects
Topology